Threatened species known to occur in the Great Barrier Reef World Heritage Area and listed under the Convention on the Conservation of Migratory Species of Wild Animals (Bonn Convention), CITES (CITES) Agreement, China–Australia Migratory Bird Agreement (CAMBA), Japan–Australia Migratory Bird Agreement and the International Union for the Conservation of Nature Red List (IUCN Red List) status for the species.

Key

Reptiles

Seabirds

Marine mammals

Sharks, skates and rays

Fish

Seahorses

Marine invertebrates

Island fauna

See also

Environmental threats to the Great Barrier Reef

References

Great Barrier Reef
Lists of biota of Queensland
Biota of Queensland by conservation status